Tin Oo is a former Burmese military officer and currently serves as the Union Auditor General of Myanmar.

Early life and education 
Tin Oo was born in Letpadan Township, Pegu, Burma (now Bago Region, Myanmar) on 24 November 1952. He graduated from the 28th batch of the Defence Services Academy.

Military career 

In the aftermath of the 2021 Myanmar coup d'état, the military junta appointed Tin Oo as the chairman of the Anti-Corruption Commission of Myanmar, a post he held from 20 February 2021 to 19 August 2022. In January 2022, the American, Canadian, and British governments sanctioned Tin Oo for his role in bringing politically motivated corruption charges against members of Myanmar's deposed civilian-led government, including Aung San Suu Kyi.

On 19 August 2022, he was appointed as Union Auditor General by the military junta, succeeding Kan Zaw.

See also 

 2021 Myanmar coup d'etat
 State Administration Council
 Tatmadaw

References 

Living people
Burmese soldiers
Defence Services Academy alumni
People from Bago Region
1952 births